Busiswa is a South African singer, and songwriter. She gained public recognition for featuring on DJ Zinhle's Song "My Name Is", after being discovered by Kalawa Jazmee CEO, Oskido. Since then, she has released two studio albums Highly Flavored and Summer Life.

Busiswa's contribution to the South African music industry has garnered her multiple awards and nominations in several music award South African Music Awards, Metro FM Music Awards, the Channel O Music Video Awards and MTV Africa Music Award In 2012,  she was named in the Mail and Guardian's Top 200 Young South Africans.

South African Music Awards
The South African Music Awards (also known as The SAMAs) are the Recording Industry of South Africa's music industry awards, established in 1995.

|-
|2012
|My Name Is"
|Record of the year
|
|-
|rowspan="2" |2018
|Highly Flavored|Best Kwaito Album
|
|-
|Herself|Best Female Artist
|
|-
|rowspan="2"|2019
|Summer Life|Best Dance Album
|
|-
|Busiswa|Best Female artist
|
|}

Metro FM Awards
Metro FM Music Awards is an annual awards ceremony that was established in 2000 by Metro FM with the aim of offering its listeners to honour their favorite South African artists. Busiswa has received one award nominations.

|-
|2014
|Visa|Best Music Video
|
|}

All Africa Music Awards

|-
|2015
|Busiswa|Best Female (Southern Africa)
|
|}

Channel O Africa Music Video Award
First held in 2003 as Reel Music Video Awards, the Channel O Africa Music Video Awards are Pan-African music awards organised by South Africa-based television channel Channel O. Busiswa has won the award once.
|-
|rowspan="2" |2012|rowspan="2" |My Name Is|Most Gifted Dance category
|
|-
|Music Video of the year
|
|-
|2013
|Ngoku
|Most Gifted Dance category
|
|}

Mtv Africa Music Awards
The MTV Africa Music Awards were established in 2008 by MTV Networks Africa to celebrate the most popular contemporary music in Africa.

|-
|2015
|Herself|Best Female 
|
|}

Feather Awards

|-
|2019
|Herself''
|Musician of the Year
|
|}

References

Busiswa